Katarina Alexandrovna Gerboldt (born 28 March 1989) is a Russian retired figure skater. In single skating, her best result at an ISU Championship was sixth at the 2009 European Championships. In 2010, she switched to pair skating, teaming up with Alexander Enbert. They appeared at one ISU Championship, the 2011 European Championships where they placed fourth.

Career

Single skating 
Gerboldt became interested in figure skating at the age of six. Gerboldt denied the assertion that her parents named her "Katarina" in honor of Katarina Witt, and stated that her parents had indeed wanted her to become a sportswoman, but not specifically a figure skater.

The 2008-09 season was a turning point in Gerboldt's career. She won the bronze medal at the 2009 Russian Championships and, as both the gold and silver medalists Adelina Sotnikova and Elizaveta Tuktamysheva were too young to participate in international competition, was named to the European Championships team. She placed sixth, skating with a drainage in her nose due to sinusitis. She was coached by Tatiana Mishina and Alexei Mishin in Saint Petersburg until 2009 when she moved to CSKA Moscow and began working with Svetlana Sokolovskaya.

Pair skating 

After an unsuccessful 2009–10 season, Tatiana Druchinina suggested to Gerboldt that she switch to pair skating. Gerboldt moved back to Saint Petersburg, where coaches Tamara Moskvina and Artur Dmitriev asked her to try out with Alexander Enbert, whom she knew since childhood. The new partnership was announced in March 2010.

During the 2010–11 season, Gerboldt/Enbert made their international debut at the 2010 Cup of Nice, which they won. They finished fourth at the 2010 Cup of Russia, their sole 2010-11 Grand Prix event. At the 2011 Russian Nationals, they placed fourth in the short program and fifth in the long, to finish fourth overall. As Tatiana Volosozhar / Maxim Trankov were ineligible to compete at the 2011 European Championships, Gerboldt/Enbert were named in2 the team for the event. They placed fifth in the short program with a new personal best score of 57.50, fourth in the free program, also with a new personal best (112.45), and finished fourth overall with 169.95 points, their best combined total.

In the 2011–12 season, Gerboldt/Enbert competed in one Grand Prix event, the 2011 Cup of Russia. In 2012–13, they were assigned to Skate Canada but withdrew due to injury – Gerboldt tore a ligament. She underwent surgery on August 2 – a week after the injury – and on October 3. Coached by Oleg Vasiliev, Gerboldt/Enbert returned to competition in the 2013–14 season but split in April 2014.

On July 12, 2014, it was announced that she had teamed up with French singles skater Brian Joubert. In November 2014, however, Joubert confirmed his competitive retirement.

Gerboldt announced her retirement from competitive figure skating on September 23, 2015, to begin coaching.

Programs

Pairs with Enbert

Single skating

Competitive highlights

Pair skating with Enbert

Single skating

References

External links 

 
 

Russian female single skaters
Russian female pair skaters
Figure skaters at the 2007 Winter Universiade
Figure skaters from Saint Petersburg
Russian people of German descent
Living people
1989 births
Competitors at the 2009 Winter Universiade